Manchester Withington is a constituency represented in the House of Commons of the UK Parliament since 2015 by Jeff Smith of Labour.  Of the 30 seats with the highest percentage of winning majority in 2017, the seat ranks 25th with a 55.7% margin, and is the only one of the twenty nine of these seats won by the Labour Party in which the second-placed candidate was a Liberal Democrat, rather than Conservative. This is despite being a Conservative seat right up to 1987, then becoming relatively safely Labour, then Liberal Democrat from 2005 to 2015 before they lost on a large swing in 2015, after which Smith substantially increased his majority.

History
Over the past 35 years Manchester Withington has elected all three major parties. Mostly Conservative before 1987 (with three years of Liberal Party representation near its 1918 inception), it even resisted being gained by Labour in its massive landslide victories in 1945 and 1966. However, in 1987 the seat turned red for the first time and remained so until 2005 when it was gained by Liberal Democrat John Leech. Leech took the seat with an 18% swing – the largest of the 2005 General Election. He held it against future Manchester Central MP Lucy Powell in 2010. Amidst a UK-wide collapse in support for the Lib Dems, the seat swung back to Labour in 2015 and since 2017 has now become one of the safest Labour seats in the country, with an almost 30,000 majority for Jeff Smith. It is also one of the few seats in England outside London in 2015 where UKIP lost their deposit.  Demographically contrasting with neighbouring inner-city seats with similarly high Labour majorities, it is the most affluent of all the Manchester seats, as it includes high-income, highly educated areas such as Didsbury and Chorlton.

Historic boundaries

1918–1950
Manchester Withington consisted of the County Borough of Manchester wards of Chorlton-cum-Hardy, Didsbury, and Withington.

1950–1955
Manchester Withington consisted of the County Borough of Manchester wards of Rusholme and Withington.

1955–1974
Manchester Withington consisted of the County Borough of Manchester wards of Barlow Moor, Burnage, Levenshulme, Old Moat, and Withington.

1974–1983
Manchester Withington consisted of the County Borough of Manchester wards of Barlow Moor, Burnage, Didsbury, Old Moat, and Withington.

1983–2010
Manchester Withington consisted of the City of Manchester wards of Barlow Moor, Burnage, Chorlton, Didsbury, Old Moat, and Withington.

Boundaries 

From 2010 to the present day Manchester Withington consists of the City of Manchester wards of:
 Burnage (part), Chorlton (part), Chorlton Park (part), Didsbury East, Didsbury West, Old Moat, and Withington.

Members of Parliament 
Jeff Smith is the current Labour MP for the constituency. He was elected at the 2015 general election, defeating the Liberal Democrat incumbent John Leech who had held the seat since 2005.
Both of the major parties' losing candidates in the 2010 election became MPs elsewhere by the next election, Lucy Powell of Labour in Manchester Central in a 2012 by-election and Conservative Chris Green in Bolton West in 2015.

Constituency profile
This constituency contains the medium-to-high income average areas of Chorlton and Didsbury, as well as mixed Old Moat and Withington neighbourhoods.  Manchester Withington is a seat south of Manchester's city centre with a sizeable student population and particularly high in young professionals and graduates. The southern border with Wythenshawe is the River Mersey along which there are mostly green spaces such as Fletcher Moss Park and Chorlton Water Park. Chorlton and Didsbury are mostly middle-class areas with houses on leafy roads with thriving independent shops on their respective high streets. House prices are higher than other parts of Manchester and the area has one of the highest proportion of graduates in the city. Many of the large Victorian family houses in Didsbury have been split into apartments for young professionals moving into the area.

Elections

Elections in the 2010s

Elections in the 2000s

Elections in the 1990s

Elections in the 1980s

Elections in the 1970s

Elections in the 1960s

Elections in the 1950s

Election in the 1940s

Election in the 1930s

Elections in the 1920s

Elections in the 1910s

See also 
 List of parliamentary constituencies in Greater Manchester
 Opinion polling for the next United Kingdom general election in individual constituencies

Notes

References

Withington
Constituencies of the Parliament of the United Kingdom established in 1918
Withington
Didsbury
Parliamentary constituencies in North West England